The Peninsula Hotels is a chain of luxury hotels operated by Hongkong and Shanghai Hotels.  Founded by the Kadoorie family, the first hotel opened in 1928 and now stands as the oldest in Hong Kong.

History
Hong Kong and Shanghai Hotels, Limited was incorporated in 1866. The company became engaged in real estate, acquiring land properties, and opened The Peninsula Hong Kong in Tsim Sha Tsui in 1928. The Peninsula Hong Kong holds several world records for placing the largest single orders for fleets of Rolls-Royce cars in the world.

The Peninsula Manila in Makati, Metro Manila, Philippines, opened in 1976. After a decade, the opening was followed by The Peninsula New York in 1988, as the company ventured into the American market. This was followed by a 1989 opening in Beijing and a 1991 opening in Beverly Hills.

Awards and achievements
The Peninsula Bangkok was named the #1 hotel in Asia and #7 worldwide by magazine Travel + Leisure in August 2010.
The Peninsula Tokyo was voted the second best hotel by the same magazine in 2012 in its annual "The 500 Best Hotels List".

Properties and locations
Asia
 The Peninsula Hong Kong - 1928
 The Peninsula Manila - 1976
 The Peninsula Beijing - 1989
 The Peninsula Bangkok - 1998
 The Peninsula Tokyo - 2007
 The Peninsula Shanghai - 2009
North America
 The Peninsula New York - 1988
 The Peninsula Beverly Hills - 1991
 The Peninsula Chicago - 2001
Europe
 The Peninsula Paris - 2014

Future
 The Peninsula Istanbul (2023)
 The Peninsula London (2022)

Gallery

Controversy 
The Peninsula Hotels have been criticised by campaigners for the continued use of eggs from battery-caged hens across their hotel locations. A large number of the hotel group’s competitors including Mandarin Oriental, Hyatt and Intercontinental have made commitments to use only cage-free eggs by 2025.

Hong Kong and Shanghai Hotels responded to the criticism by releasing a commitment to use only cage-free eggs, that will be achieved by 2025.

References

External links 

 
Hotels established in 1928
Multinational companies headquartered in Hong Kong
Former companies in the Hang Seng Index
Hospitality companies of Hong Kong
Hong Kong brands
Luxury brands
1928 establishments in Hong Kong
Hotel chains